Nadja Månsson (born Nadgornaja; 22 September 1988 in Kiev, Ukraine) is a German handball player for Borussia Dortmund.

She participated at the 2011 World Women's Handball Championship in Brazil.

Individual awards 
Carpathian Trophy Top Scorer: 2013
Bundesliga Top Scorer: 2013

References

1988 births
Living people
Sportspeople from Kyiv
German female handball players
Ukrainian emigrants to Germany